Snipe is an unincorporated community in central Brazoria County, Texas, United States. It was formerly a distinct community. It is located within the Greater Houston metropolitan area.

History
Raymond Weems, Snipe's first postmaster, named Snipe after a facetious reference made about the place by his father's hunting partner. Snipe was established in the former Ward Plantation area owned by Asa Mitchell. The St. Louis, Brownsville and Mexico Railway laid a track through the community around 1905. Locals wanted the station to be named after early settler Ed Matthews, but it was instead named Edmonds. A post office operated in Snipe from 1921 to 1949; the post office served the Retrieve Prison Farm (later the Wayne Scott Unit). A railroad bunkhouse and commissary were in operation in 1929. There was only one business and 15 residents in the early 1930s. The Ward Plantation was destroyed by a storm in 1932. Its population rose to 75 in 1970 and gained three more residents four years later, but seemingly disappeared in 1988.

Geography

Education
Today, the community is served by the Angleton Independent School District. Children in the area attend Westside Elementary School, Angleton Junior High School, and Angleton High School in Angleton.

References

Unincorporated communities in Brazoria County, Texas
Unincorporated communities in Texas